Henry Isaac (born 14 February 1980), formerly known as Henry Nwosu, is a Nigerian former professional footballer who played as a forward.

Career
Born in Owerri, Isaac began his career in Iwuanyanwu Nationale. In 1998, he moved to Eintracht Frankfurt. He made his debut in the Bundesliga in 1998 against FC Schalke 04. After his time at Eintracht Frankfurt he played in the 2. Bundesliga with Waldhof Mannheim and FC St. Pauli.

References

1980 births
Living people
People from Owerri
Sportspeople from Imo State
Nigerian footballers
Association football forwards
Heartland F.C. players
Eintracht Frankfurt players
Eintracht Frankfurt II players
SV Waldhof Mannheim players
FC St. Pauli players
Veria F.C. players
Sandefjord Fotball players
Knattspyrnufélagið Fram players
Vittoriosa Stars F.C. players
Sliema Wanderers F.C. players
Xagħra United F.C. players
BFC Siófok players
Nigeria Professional Football League players
Bundesliga players
2. Bundesliga players
Gamma Ethniki players
Football League (Greece) players
Eliteserien players
Úrvalsdeild karla (football) players
Maltese Challenge League players
Maltese Premier League players
Nemzeti Bajnokság I players
Nigeria international footballers
Nigerian expatriate footballers
Nigerian expatriate sportspeople in Germany
Nigerian expatriate sportspeople in Greece
Nigerian expatriate sportspeople in Norway
Nigerian expatriate sportspeople in Iceland
Nigerian expatriate sportspeople in Malta
Nigerian expatriate sportspeople in Hungary
Expatriate footballers in Germany
Expatriate footballers in Greece
Expatriate footballers in Norway
Expatriate footballers in Iceland
Expatriate footballers in Malta
Expatriate footballers in Hungary